Rajinder Garg (born 30 May 1966) is an Indian horticulturalist and politician who has served in the Himachal Pradesh Legislative Assembly since 2017, representing the Ghumarwin constituency. A member of the Bharatiya Janata Party, Garg has served as the state's Minister of Food, Civil Supplies, and Consumer Affairs since 2020.

Biography 
Rajinder Garg was born on 30 May 1966 in the village of Thandora in Himachal Pradesh. Garg attended Himachal Pradesh University and Jiwaji University, receiving a master's degree in botany from the latter in 1990. After graduating, Garg worked as a horticulturalist and businessman.

In 1982, Garg became a member of the Rashtriya Swayamsevak Sangh, a Hindu nationalist paramilitary group. The following year, he joined its student organization, Akhil Bharatiya Vidyarthi Parishad, and became a local leader for the ABVP, serving as its chairman in the Bilaspur district from 1986 to 1987. Garg served as the ABVP's secretary in Himachal Pradesh from 1987 until 1988, and as its secretary in Madhya Pradesh from 1990 until 1997. In 2000, Garg became a local journalist for the Dainik Bhaskar newspaper. Garg worked at Dainik Bhaskar until 2006, when he became the chairman of a Bharatiya Janata Party training camp, serving until 2010. From 2006 until 2010, Garg also served as a member of the Himachal Pradesh Board of School Education and the Himachal Pradesh Board of Technical Education.

In the 2012 election, Garg stood as a BJP candidate for the Himachal Pradesh Legislative Assembly, running in the Ghumarwin Assembly constituency against incumbent MLA Rajesh Dharmani of the Indian National Congress. Garg was defeated by Dharmani, receiving 19,464 votes to Dharmani's 22,672. In the 2017 election, Garg defeated Dharmani in a rematch, receiving 34,846 votes compared to Dharmani's 24,411. In the 2022 election, Garg is again facing Dharmani, as well as Aam Aadmi Party candidate Rakesh Chopra. Zee News considers the race to be competitive due to INC's historical strength in the district, though they also noted that the BJP has been growing its local outreach capabilities.

On 30 July 2020, Garg was appointed the state's Minister of Food, Civil Supplies, and Consumer Affairs by Jai Ram Thakur, the chief minister of Himachal Pradesh. Garg's appointment was seen as a surprise due to the short length of his tenure and other senior MLAs not having ministerial positions. The Tribune suggested that Garg may have been selected due to his prior affiliation with RSS and his residency in the Bilaspur district, where J. P. Nadda, the national president of the BJP, is also from. During his tenure as minister, Garg oversaw the completion of a project which would provide free liquefied petroleum gas connections to every house in the state.

References 

1966 births
People from Bilaspur district, Himachal Pradesh
Himachal Pradesh University alumni
Jiwaji University alumni
Indian horticulturists
Rashtriya Swayamsevak Sangh members
21st-century Indian journalists
Bharatiya Janata Party politicians from Himachal Pradesh
Himachal Pradesh MLAs 2017–2022
State cabinet ministers of Himachal Pradesh
Living people